Allium achaium is a plant species endemic to Greece.<ref>[http://apps.kew.org/wcsp/namedetail.do?name_id=294892 Kew World Checklist of Selected Plant Families, Allium achaium']</ref>Allium achaium'' produces egg-shaped bulbs up to 25 mm long. Scape is up to 30 cm tall, round in cross-section, erect, about 5 mm across. Leaves are about the same length as the scape, 3 mm wide. Umbel has up to 45 flowers, the pedicels unequal in length. Flowers are bell-shaped, pale yellow tinged with pink. Anthers are yellow, ovary green.

References

External links
JSTOR photo of herbarium specimen at Kew Botanical Gardens, syntype of Allium achaium

achaium
Onions
Flora of Greece
Plants described in 1882